{{Automatic taxobox
| image = Himantura uarnak egypt.jpg
| image_caption = Reticulate whipray (Himantura uarnak)
| taxon = Himantura
| authority = J. P. Müller & Henle, 1837 
| type_species = [[Reticulate whipray|Raja sephen uarnak]]| type_species_authority = J. F. Gmelin, 1789
}}Himantura is a genus of stingray in the family Dasyatidae that is native to the Indo-Pacific. In a 2016 taxonomic revision, many of the species formerly assigned to Himantura were reassigned to other genera (Brevitrygon, Fluvitrygon, Maculabatis, Pateobatis, Styracura and Urogymnus).

Species
Four species are recognized as valid by some authors, while other authors recognize five valid species.	Himantura australis Last, White & Naylor, 2016 (Australian whipray)Himantura leoparda Manjaji-Matsumoto & Last, 2008 (Leopard whipray)Himantura uarnak (J. F. Gmelin, 1789) (Reticulate whipray)Himantura undulata (Bleeker, 1852) (Honeycomb whipray)

The fifth species, Himantura tutul (fine-spotted leopard whipray) has had its validity disputed  and has been considered a junior synonym of H. uarnak by the Catalog of Fishes. However, H. tutul was previously confused not with H. uarnak, but with H. leoparda, and subsequently shown to be genetically distinct and reproductively isolated from both H. uarnak and H. leoparda. Both adult H. leoparda and H. tutul present leopard-like ocellated spots. These are smaller and less numerous in H. tutul''.

References

 
Dasyatidae
Ray genera
Taxa named by Johannes Peter Müller
Taxa named by Friedrich Gustav Jakob Henle